American entertainer Whitney Houston worked in four feature films, one television film, and seven television episodes, and appeared in seventeen commercials. 

She made her screen acting debut as Rachel Marron in the romantic thriller film The Bodyguard (1992). It was the second-highest-grossing film worldwide in 1992, making $411 million worldwide. The Bodyguard received negative reviews from film critics, and received seven Golden Raspberry Award nominations, including Worst Picture. The soundtrack became the best-selling soundtrack of all time, selling more than 45 million copies worldwide. 

In 1995, Houston starred alongside Angela Bassett, Loretta Devine, and Lela Rochon in her second film, Waiting to Exhale (1995), which was notable for having an all-African-American cast, and was called by The Los Angeles Times a "social phenomenon". Upon release, the film received mixed reviews from critics. Waiting to Exhale was a financial success, grossing $14.1 million in its first weekend of release. In total, the film grossed $67.05 million in North America, and $14.4 million internationally, for a total worldwide gross of $81.45 million, making it the 26th highest-grossing film of 1995. The soundtrack to the film, which has sold over twelve million copies worldwide, also featured exclusively female African-American artists, and, at the 39th Grammy Awards in 1997, received a total of eleven nominations including Album of the Year, Song of the Year for "Exhale (Shoop Shoop)" and three Best Female R&B Vocal Performance nominees, then won Best R&B Song for "Exhale (Shoop Shoop)". 

In 1996, Houston starred in the holiday comedy The Preacher's Wife, with Denzel Washington. Houston earned $10 million for the role, making her one of the highest-paid actresses in Hollywood at the time and the highest-earning African-American actress in Hollywood. The movie was a moderate success, earning approximately $50 million at the U.S. box offices. It was nominated for five Image Awards, including Outstanding Motion Picture, and won two—for Best Actress (Whitney Houston) and Best Supporting Actress (Loretta Devine). It was nominated for the Academy Award for Best Music, Original Musical or Comedy Score. The Preacher's Wife: Original Soundtrack Album is the best-selling gospel album of all time. The soundtrack also remained at number one for a record twenty-six weeks on the Billboard Top Gospel Albums Chart.

Feature films

Television

Commercials

References

Actress filmographies
Filmography
American filmographies